The Men's 470 was a sailing event on the Sailing at the 2004 Summer Olympics program in Agios Kosmas Olympic Sailing Centre,  in the 470 dinghy. Eleven races were scheduled and completed. 54 sailors, on 27 boats, from 27 nation competed.

Race schedule

Course area and course configuration

Weather conditions

Final results

Daily standings

Further reading

References 

Men's 470
470 competitions
Men's events at the 2004 Summer Olympics